The Bambino is a breed of cat that was created as a cross between the Sphynx and the Munchkin breeds. The Bambino cat has short legs, large upright ears, and is usually hairless. However, some Bambino cats do have fur. In 2005, The International Cat Association (TICA) registered Bambinos as an experimental breed.

Background
The first litter of Bambino kittens was registered in 2005 by The International Cat Association (TICA) as an experimental breed. 

 in Italian translates to "baby", referring to the cat's appearance of making it look like a kitten. The Bambino has short legs it inherits from the Munchkin, and huge upright ears, as well as having the hairlessness of the Sphynx.

Physical characteristics 
The wrinkled hairless appearance and short legs are the breed's two most distinctive features. Though Bambinos can be coated with fur, this, however, is referred to as a "coated Bambino".  

The back legs can be slightly longer than the front legs. The body is medium to long, with a broad chest and a well-rounded abdomen. Boning is medium. The whippy tail is in good proportion to the rest of the body. Some Bambinos can have a "lion tail"—a puff of hair on the tail tip. The head is a modified wedge with rounded lines, slightly longer than wide. As well as in the Sphynx, the cheekbones and whisker pads are very prominent. The whiskers are sparse and short. The chin is firm. The eyes are large, rounded, and wide spaced. The large ears are set upright, neither too low nor too high. The cat's size and physical qualities do not hamper its movements.

Their weight is typically .

Coat and grooming 
Even though some Bambinos appear hairless, they typically are covered with a fine downy fur. Their wrinkled skin feels like chamois or suede to the touch. Regular grooming is necessary to remove sebaceous secretions from the skin, and baths are recommended. If grooming and bathing aren't done on a regular basis, the Bambino can become excessively dirty, oily, and sticky to the touch and/or develop skin conditions.

The Bambino skin is vulnerable to temperature and sun, and they must be kept as an indoor cat. Contrary to popular belief, Bambino cats are not hypoallergenic.

Genetics and health 

Bambino is called a mutation breed because it is a breed that requires both recessive mutations for the hairless gene, and dominant mutations for the dwarfed limbs. Mutation breeding can be disastrous to the health of the produced kitten, if not done by an experienced breeder.

Typically Bambino litters produce both kittens that resemble and do not resemble the parents, and which can result in litters of short-legged and long-legged kittens, as the Bambino genetics are heterozygous for the short leg gene. Bambino litters cannot produce furry kittens as the hairless gene is recessive, and so each bambino has two copies of the hairless gene.

Due to the concern of animal welfare, the breeding of Bambino cats is not legal in all countries. Some examples of Bambino breeding restrictions are Germany and the Federal German Animal Protection Act of 1999, and the Netherlands and the Netherlands Food and Consumer Product Safety Authority (NVWA).

Health 
Since the breed is new, more research needs to be done to confirm the presence or absence of possible genetic health issues. However, common health problems typical of the related Munchkin breed of cat are well-known, the most common being an above higher average of lordosis (excessive curvature of the spine) and pectus excavatum (hollowed chest).

The Bambino breed is prone to developing bacterial skin conditions and infections due to the hairlessness and skin folds, as well as an inability to regulate the oiliness of their skin.

See also 

Cat coat genetics
Minskin, a breed of cat derived from crossing the Munchkin with the Sphynx and is often confused with Bambino cats.
 Sphynx cat, a breed of hairless cat
 List of experimental cat breeds, which includes other short-legged cat breeds like Dwelf and Lambkin

References

Cat breeds
Experimental cat breeds
Hairless cat breeds
Cat breeds and types with short legs
Mutation